Tsai Ling-lan (born 13 May 1942) is a Taiwanese politician.

She served on the National Assembly and was later elected to two terms on the Legislative Yuan. Tsai has served as national policy adviser to President Ma Ying-jeou.

References

1942 births
Living people
20th-century Taiwanese women politicians
Party List Members of the Legislative Yuan
Kuomintang Members of the Legislative Yuan in Taiwan
Members of the 4th Legislative Yuan
Members of the 5th Legislative Yuan
Senior Advisors to President Ma Ying-jeou
21st-century Taiwanese women politicians